The 2014 Canadian Mixed Curling Championship was held from November 14 to 23 at the Rideau Curling Club in Ottawa, Ontario. Alberta's Darren Moulding defeated defending champion Cory Heggestad of Ontario in the final with a score of 8–5.

Qualifying round
Four associations did not automatically qualify to the championships, and will participate in a qualifying round. The Northwest Territories and Yukon were relegated from the championships due to finishing at the bottom of the standings in the previous year's championships. Two qualification spots will be awarded to the two winners of a double knockout round.

Teams
The teams are listed as follows:

Knockout brackets

Knockout results
All draw times are listed in Eastern Standard Time (UTC–5).

First knockout
Thursday, November 14, 2:00 pm

Thursday, November 14, 7:00 pm

Second knockout
Thursday, November 14, 7:00 pm

Friday, November 15, 2:00 pm

Teams
The teams are listed as follows:

Round-robin standings
Final round-robin standings

Round-robin results
All draw times are listed in Eastern Standard Time (UTC–5).

Draw 1
Saturday, November 16, 7:30 pm

Draw 2
Sunday, November 17, 10:00 am

Draw 3
Sunday, November 17, 2:30 pm

Draw 4
Sunday, November 17, 7:00 pm

Draw 5
Monday, November 18, 10:00 am

Draw 6
Monday, November 18, 2:30 pm

Draw 7
Monday, November 18, 7:00 pm

Draw 8
Tuesday, November 19, 10:00 am

Draw 9
Tuesday, November 19, 2:30 pm

Draw 10
Tuesday, November 19, 7:00 pm

Draw 11
Wednesday, November 20, 10:00 am

Draw 12
Wednesday, November 20, 2:30 pm

Draw 13
Wednesday, November 20, 7:00 pm

Draw 14
Thursday, November 21, 10:00 am

Draw 15
Thursday, November 21, 2:30 pm

Draw 16
Thursday, November 21, 7:00 pm

Draw 17
Friday, November 22, 10:00 am

Tiebreaker
Friday, November 22, 2:30 pm

Playoffs

Semifinal
Friday, November 22, 7:30 pm

Final
Saturday, November 23, 2:00 pm

References

External links

2013 in Canadian curling
Curling in Ottawa
Canadian Mixed Curling Championship
November 2013 sports events in Canada
2010s in Ottawa